William Winkenwerder, Jr. is a physician and prominent American health care industry leader. Currently, he is the Chairman and CEO of Winkenwerder Strategies, where he works with global private equity firms, such as Bain Capital, EQT, Carlyle Group and Partners Group, and healthcare companies such as CitiusTech and Confluent Health, to transform the trajectory of healthcare nationwide.

Previously, he served as CEO at Highmark Health, one of the country’s largest diversified health insurance companies, and as Assistant Secretary of Defense for Health Affairs. He also has served in other executive positions within the health industry over a nearly four-decade healthcare career, including as founder of a health care strategy consulting firm focused on transformative change and innovative health care technologies, and as a senior executive with notable large payer and provider organizations.

Career
Winkenwerder Strategies, Private Equity
After serving in a variety of executive and leadership roles in the private and public sectors, Winkenwerder pivoted in late 2014 to establish Winkenwerder Strategies and work in private equity. During the years since, he has worked with General Atlantic, Harvest Partners, Baring Private Equity (now part of EQT), Empactful Capital, Carlyle Group, Partners Group, and Bain Capital. He has served on the boards of Athletico, Accreon, Cureatr, Net Health, Confluent Health, and CitiusTech. He has also served on the boards of not-for-profits, WPS Health Solutions and UNC Health, and as an advisor to several emerging digital health leaders – Elation Health, Arrive Health, Kyruus, Care Continuity, and Credo Health. In these roles, he has been a key advisor to the CEO, and helped to shape leadership, governance, and strategy. His principal current engagements are as Chairman at CitiusTech and Chair / Lead Director at Confluent Health, both multibillion-dollar valuation companies.

Highmark Health

Winkenwerder served as CEO at Highmark Health, a diversified health care enterprise that at the time had $17 billion in revenues, 38,000 employees and 35 million individual customers. Highmark comprises several Blue Cross Blue Shield health plans; subsidiary companies in vision care, dental insurance, and stop-loss insurance coverage; an IT services company; and a large integrated care delivery network with seven hospitals and more than 2,000 affiliated physicians.

During Winkenwerder's tenure at Highmark, he led several acquisitions, restructured the company overall, introduced new products, created new business units, and successfully managed the initial phases of implementation for the Affordable Care Act. Winkenwerder secured important new partnerships for Highmark with Johns Hopkins Medicine and Carnegie Mellon University. As CEO, he increased revenues by nearly $4 billion overall, and the company added 18,000 new employees. In 2014 Winkenwerder resigned his role with Highmark to pursue new opportunities.

The Winkenwerder Company

Prior to Highmark Health, Winkenwerder served from 2007 to 2012 as chairman of The Winkenwerder Company, specializing in strategic advisory services to innovative health care organizations. The firm’s clients included large, prominent US health care organizations such as Kaiser Permanente and Johns Hopkins Medicine, and leading technology companies introducing new IT solutions to the health care sector, such as Microsoft Corporation, 3M Corporation, and Harris Corporation.

Winkenwerder served during this time on boards of directors for publicly held and private corporations, and charitable health care organizations. Corporations including Logistics Health Inc. (now a part of United Health Group), Athenahealth, Inc., CapGemini Government Solutions. Charitable organizations include The CEO Roundtable on Cancer, C-Change (an alliance of organizations fighting cancer founded by former President George H. W. Bush and former First Lady Barbara Bush), The Bob Woodruff Foundation (founded by ABC News anchor Bob Woodruff and wife Lee Woodruff, dedicated to the needs of military families dealing with traumatic brain injury.) Winkenwerder served as a board director of the Davidson College Athletic Foundation, his alma mater, where he was a quarterback on the football team. He was also a Board Trustee for Davidson College from 2015 to 2022, where he chaired the academic affairs committee.

U.S. Department of Defense

Through presidential appointment by President George W. Bush, Winkenwerder served as Assistant Secretary of Defense for Health Affairs for nearly 7 years. He directed all programs, policies, and budgets for the Military Health System – TRICARE – with 9.2M beneficiaries, $40B annual budget, 70 hospitals and 800 clinics worldwide, medical school, nursing school, and 132K personnel.

During his tenure, Winkenwerder developed and deployed the world’s largest EMR. He rigorously managed the defense health budget, returning more than $1.2B to the comptroller. Over a period of 5 years, he structured, awarded, and implemented $45B in new TRICARE contracts. Notably, Winkenwerder steered the creation of the National Military Medical Center (NMMC) by consolidating Walter Reed Army Medical Center, Bethesda Naval Medical Center, and several smaller military hospitals into the newly formed NMMC.

Early Career Roles

Prior to serving in the public sector at the Department of Defense, Winkenwerder also worked from 1987 to 2001 as a senior executive in the private health care industry, and as a practicing physician. With education in medicine (University of North Carolina School of Medicine) and health care finance (The Wharton School, University of Pennsylvania), Winkenwerder offered notable insights early in his career that were central to the finance and delivery of cost-effective health care to a broad base of patient populations. Of note was his early advocacy of evidence-based medicine, prevention and clinical practice guidelines, which are now widely viewed as significant elements for high standards of care. He helped conceptualize and create the legislation for the Agency for Healthcare Research and Quality (AHRQ) while at the Health Care Financing Administration (HCFA) in 1987-1988.

Winkenwerder served as an executive at Blue Cross Blue Shield of Massachusetts, for Prudential Healthcare (now Aetna) and at Emory Healthcare of Emory University – now the largest provider of healthcare in the State of Georgia. He was also a practicing primary care physician and Medical Director for Kaiser Permanente.

Professional Achievements, Recognition, and Media 
Industry Leadership

Well-respected in the national healthcare industry, Winkenwerder is a regular contributor to Forbes and has published articles, interviews, and editorials in Health Affairs, New England Journal of Medicine, Journal of the American Medical Association, New York Times, Washington Post, Wall Street Journal, and USA Today. He has contributed to national news and media outlets including CNN, ABC, NBC, CBS, Fox News, Fox Business, and CNBC.

Recognitions

Winkenwerder has been recognized for his professional achievements by:

 The American Medical Association
 The University of North Carolina School of Medicine
 The Wharton School of Business
 Davidson College
 The United States Department of Defense

Living people
Davidson College alumni
United States Assistant Secretaries of Defense
University of North Carolina School of Medicine alumni
Wharton School of the University of Pennsylvania alumni
American chief executives
Year of birth missing (living people)